Samara Nohra is a Lebanese actress.

Filmography

Film 
Halal Love - Jeannette. 2015
I Offered You Pleasure - Saada (Short). 2011

Television 
Al Mouaallima Wal Oustaz. 1980
Itiham - Walid's mother. 2014
Mesh Ana 2016

Dubbing roles 
 Belle and Sebastian
 Maya the Honey Bee
 Snorks
 The Smurfs - Smurfette
 Toy Story 2 - Mrs. Potato Head (Classical Arabic version)
 Toy Story 3 - Mrs. Potato Head (Classical Arabic version)

References

External links 

Living people
Lebanese television actresses
Lebanese voice actresses
Year of birth missing (living people)
21st-century Lebanese actresses